Five Get Over Excited is a song by The Housemartins released as a single from their album The People Who Grinned Themselves to Death.

The follow-up to their #1 UK hit "Caravan of Love" (although it was preceded by the USA-only release of "Flag Day"), it peaked at #11 on the UK Singles Chart in June 1987.

Although it was the first single without drummer Hugh Whitaker, who left the band before this song and album were recorded, Whitaker appears in the music video for the track, where he is kidnapped by new drummer Dave Hemingway.

Music writer Rikki Rooksby notes that the track's "anti-hyperbolic title" is "positively revolutionary", as the use of hyperbole in pop lyrics is pervasive but never admitted.   In 2007, the Manchester Evening News described the tune as "another corking chart hit that stands as a beacon amongst the dross of the 1980s."

7 inch single track listing
"Five Get Over Excited" 
"Rebel Without The Airplay"

12 inch/cassette single track listing

"Five Get Over Excited"
"So Glad"
"Hopelessly Devoted To Them"
"Rebel Without The Airplay"

Charts

References 

The Housemartins songs
1987 singles
Songs written by Paul Heaton
Go! Discs singles
1987 songs
Songs written by Stan Cullimore